Kasey C. Keller (born November 29, 1969) is an American former professional soccer player who played in Europe and the United States, as well as being the starting goalkeeper for the U.S. national team. He is a four-time FIFA World Cup participant and was the first American goalkeeper to become a regular in the German Bundesliga, the English Premier League, and the Spanish La Liga.

Keller retired after three seasons with Seattle Sounders FC after they joined Major League Soccer. He was the Sounders' color commentator in local television broadcasts from 2012 to 2022, and assistant coach for Newport High School Boys Soccer in Bellevue, Washington. He also frequently appears on ESPN FC.

Club career

Early career
Keller was born in Olympia, Washington. He attended North Thurston High School and played college soccer at the University of Portland under Clive Charles. As a freshman in 1988, he helped lead the team to the NCAA men's soccer final four. He earned first team All American as a senior and was the 1991 Adidas Goalkeeper of the Year. During the 1989 college off-season, he played for the Portland Timbers of the Western Soccer Alliance. His outstanding play led to his selection as league MVP that year. In 10 games, he allowed only four goals, for a 0.38 goals-against-average and eight clean sheets.

In 1989, he split his time between the Portland Timbers and the U.S. U-20 national team, which finished fourth at the 1989 FIFA U-20 World Cup. Keller once again excelled and was awarded the tournament's Silver Ball as the tournament's second-best player.

Millwall
After being a member of the U.S. National Team in the 1990 FIFA World Cup, he was signed by the English club Millwall, playing there and becoming a fan favorite between 1992 and 1996. Keller made his Millwall debut on May 2, 1992, and played his last game on May 5, 1996, making 202 overall appearances for The Lions. Keller was voted Player of The Year 1992–93 by the Lions fans and also picked up the Junior Lions and Disabled Millwall Fans awards. When Millwall were relegated to the Second Division, the team transferred Keller to Leicester City for £900,000 on August 15, 1996.

Keller was still studying for a sociology degree by correspondence when he played for Millwall, and wrote a paper on the club's hooligans.

Leicester City
In his first year with Leicester City, Keller played a vital part in the team's success in both a strong league position and winning the 1997 League Cup. The team reached the final again in 1999; a last minute goal lost them the match. That summer, he left the club for Spain on a free transfer.

Rayo Vallecano
Keller signed with the newly promoted Spanish club Rayo Vallecano for the 1999–2000 season and played there for two years.

Tottenham Hotspur
In August 2001, Keller returned to England and the Premier League, joining Tottenham Hotspur on a free transfer. Relegated to backup duty for Neil Sullivan early on, he won the starting spot and played every minute for Spurs in both the 2002–03 and the 2003–04 seasons.

In the 2004–05 Premiership season, Keller fell out of favor at Tottenham, as Paul Robinson became the first-choice keeper. In November 2004, Kasey was loaned out to Southampton, a Premiership club ravaged by injuries to its goalkeepers, for one month.

Borussia Mönchengladbach

On January 15, 2005, Keller joined German Bundesliga side Borussia Mönchengladbach on a free transfer during the Bundesliga's winter break. He got off to a good start in the Bundesliga, keeping a clean sheet in his first appearance for Borussia. Keller played every minute in the second half of the season and kept a total of seven clean sheets in that period, playing an important role in saving the club from relegation.

Keller also lived in Haus Donk, a castle in Tönisvorst, near Mönchengladbach. During the 2006–07 season he was one of the two Bundesliga players to be hobby-columnists for RUND, a German soccer magazine published monthly, reflecting his life in Germany and his Bundesliga career within those lines. He shared that role with VfB Stuttgart's shot-stopper Timo Hildebrand.

On August 10, 2006, Keller was selected by his teammates to captain club side Borussia Mönchengladbach during the 2006–07 campaign. He is the second American (after Claudio Reyna) to captain a top-level German club.

Fulham
In August 2007, Keller returned to the Premier League, signing for Fulham. The length of Keller's contract and financial details were not disclosed by the club. He was bought as a backup to goalkeeper Antti Niemi, but nagging injuries to Niemi saw him take over as principal goalkeeper at Fulham. However, the day before the Premier League match against Derby County in October, Keller injured his arm in training and was on the sidelines until late January. He returned as a substitute keeper in the 2–1 win over Aston Villa on February 3. From then on he was only second choice until Fulham's match against Blackburn where he started the game, with Niemi on the bench. He then went on to start Fulham's remaining games as they defied all odds and avoided relegation on the last day of the season with a 1–0 win over Portsmouth at Fratton Park.

Seattle Sounders FC

On August 14, 2008, Keller returned to the United States to sign with 2009 MLS expansion team Seattle Sounders FC. He was the starting goalkeeper for the MLS team's first-ever match, on March 19, 2009, which the Sounders won 3–0. He continued to have a clean sheet in each of his next three starts, with a score of 2–0 per start. He also set the record for most minutes without a goal to start a season in MLS history. His clean sheet streak came to an end on May 2, 2009, at 457 minutes in the second half of a game against the Chicago Fire. Keller played his final regular season home game for the Sounders on October 15, 2011, a game in which the Sounders beat the San Jose Earthquakes 2–1, with goals from Sammy Ochoa and Fredy Montero to send Keller out in style. A record crowd of 64,140 people were present.

International career
Keller got his first senior team cap against Colombia on February 4, 1990, and was on the roster as Tony Meola's back up at the 1990 FIFA World Cup.

After being ignored by U.S. coach Bora Milutinović for the 1994 FIFA World Cup, he made Steve Sampson's ill-fated squad in 1998, and played two games at the World Cup. Keller was an overage selection for the 1996 Olympics team, starting all three matches.

Kasey was named U.S. Soccer Athlete of the Year in 1997 and 1999, and again in 2005.

Perhaps his most famous clean sheet came in the historic 1998 win versus Brazil. Keller played all 90 minutes in goal and made ten saves, many from point-blank range, in preserving the 1–0 shutout victory for the U.S. His performance in goal prompted Brazilian great Romário to remark "That is the best performance by a goalkeeper I have ever seen," the performance was commemorated in the song "Kasey Keller" by synth-pop band Barcelona.

For most of their careers, Keller and Brad Friedel were engaged in a head-to-head battle for the U.S. goalkeeper's jersey. Keller got the nod in 1998 but was second choice to Friedel in the 2002 FIFA World Cup. In spite of this stiff competition he has the second most caps and wins of any men's goalkeeper in U.S. soccer history with 102 and 53, respectively, behind Tim Howard. Keller remains the team's all-time leader in keeping clean sheets with 47.

Keller crowned the U.S.'s run in the 2005 CONCACAF Gold Cup tournament with a clean sheet in the final match against Panama and two saves in the penalty shootout to give the side the trophy. Keller started the first seven games of the final round of World Cup qualifying in 2005, recording five consecutive clean sheets and 507 consecutive goalless minutes to lead the U.S. to qualification for the 2006 FIFA World Cup Finals in Germany. He then became the first male player in U.S. history to win his third Athlete of the Year award. On May 2, 2006, Keller and teammate Claudio Reyna became the first two American men named to four World Cup Rosters. In that World Cup, he played in all three games, being named Man of the Match in the 1–1 draw with Italy in Kaiserslautern on June 17, 2006. Keller is the only U.S. player to participate in both the 1990 and 2006 World Cups.

Broadcasting career

Keller joined the Seattle Sounders FC broadcast team as a color commentator alongside play-by-play announcer Ross Fletcher in 2012. He remained with the club through the 2022 season, when Apple TV's MLS Season Pass took over from local broadcasters. Keller also worked on ESPN broadcasts as a color commentator and studio analyst for various international tournaments and ESPN FC programs.

Personal life
Keller resides in Seattle with his wife Kristin and their two children, twins born on August 26, 1997. Keller has lived in London, Madrid, and Germany, where he and his family lived in a 1,000-year-old castle.
During his time abroad, Keller has learned to speak German and Spanish fluently. He told the New York Times that he turned down offers from several European clubs to sign with Seattle for the sake of his children, who have attended a new school with every transfer he has made. Keller has been featured on ESPN as a soccer analyst.

In April 2016, Keller and his former USMNT goalkeeper teammate Marcus Hahnemann became coaches of the boys' soccer team at Newport High School in Bellevue, Washington.

 Career statistics 

HonorsLeicester CityFootball League Cup: 1996–97Seattle Sounders FCLamar Hunt U.S. Open Cup: 2009, 2010, 2011United States'''
CONCACAF Gold Cup: 1991, 2002, 2005, 2007Individual'''
 Millwall Player of the Year: 1992–93
 National Soccer Hall of Fame: 2015
 FIFA World Youth Championship Silver Ball: 1989
 Honda Player of the Year: 1999, 2005
 U.S. Soccer Athlete of the Year: 1997, 1999, 2005
 MLS Goalkeeper of the Year: 2011
 Western Soccer League MVP:1989 Western Soccer League
 Western Soccer League Top Goalkeeper: 1989
 State of Washington Sports Hall of Fame: 2017
 CONCACAF Gold Cup Best XI (Honorable Mention): 2005

See also
 List of men's footballers with 100 or more international caps

References

External links

 
 
 Kasey Keller at Millwall-History.co.uk
 

1969 births
Living people
American people of German descent
Sportspeople from Olympia, Washington
Soccer players from Washington (state)
American soccer players
Association football goalkeepers
Parade High School All-Americans (boys' soccer)
Portland Pilots men's soccer players
All-American men's college soccer players
Portland Timbers (1985–1990) players
Millwall F.C. players
Leicester City F.C. players
Rayo Vallecano players
Tottenham Hotspur F.C. players
Southampton F.C. players
Borussia Mönchengladbach players
Fulham F.C. players
Seattle Sounders FC players
Western Soccer Alliance players
English Football League players
Premier League players
La Liga players
Bundesliga players
Major League Soccer players
Major League Soccer All-Stars
American expatriate soccer players
American expatriate sportspeople in England
American expatriate sportspeople in Spain
American expatriate soccer players in Germany
Expatriate footballers in England
Expatriate footballers in Spain
United States men's under-20 international soccer players
United States men's under-23 international soccer players
Olympic soccer players of the United States
United States men's international soccer players
1990 FIFA World Cup players
1991 CONCACAF Gold Cup players
1995 Copa América players
1996 CONCACAF Gold Cup players
Footballers at the 1996 Summer Olympics
1998 CONCACAF Gold Cup players
1998 FIFA World Cup players
1999 FIFA Confederations Cup players
2002 CONCACAF Gold Cup players
2002 FIFA World Cup players
2003 CONCACAF Gold Cup players
2005 CONCACAF Gold Cup players
2006 FIFA World Cup players
2007 CONCACAF Gold Cup players
2007 Copa América players
CONCACAF Gold Cup-winning players
FIFA Century Club
National Soccer Hall of Fame members
Major League Soccer broadcasters
Articles containing video clips
Association football coaches
Pan American Games gold medalists for the United States
Pan American Games medalists in football
Medalists at the 1991 Pan American Games
Footballers at the 1991 Pan American Games